Domenico Casati (born June 21, 1943 in Treviglio, Lombardy) is a retired Italian professional football player.

1943 births
Living people
People from Treviglio
Italian footballers
Serie A players
Juventus F.C. players
Atalanta B.C. players
Brescia Calcio players
Pisa S.C. players
A.C. Perugia Calcio players
Association football defenders
Sportspeople from the Province of Bergamo
Footballers from Lombardy
Atalanta B.C. non-playing staff
Hellas Verona F.C. non-playing staff
A.S. Roma non-playing staff
Inter Milan non-playing staff
Torino F.C. non-playing staff